The Psou is a river in the  West Caucasus, bordering the Gagra Range to the east. It flows along the southern slopes of the Greater Caucasus Mountain Range and forms a part of the border between Georgia (Abkhazia) and Russia. Its source in the Aigra Mountain, and it flows into the Black Sea.

The principal tributaries of the Psou are the Besh and the Pkhista.
The Psou gained notoriety as a smuggling route out of the country, by-passing Russian controls on the border. As of 2008 it was still designated as a transboundary river which lacked an international cooperation agreement as part of the UNECE Water Convention.

References

Rivers of Krasnodar Krai
Rivers of Georgia (country)
Rivers of Abkhazia
International rivers of Europe
International rivers of Asia
Georgia (country)–Russia border
Smuggling routes
Drainage basins of the Black Sea